Mărgineni is a commune in Bacău County, Western Moldavia, Romania. It is composed of eight villages: Barați (Barát), Luncani (Lunkány), Mărgineni, Pădureni, Podiș, Poiana, Trebeș (Terebes) and Valea Budului.

At the 2002 census, 99.8% of inhabitants were ethnic Romanians. 57.5% were Roman Catholic and 41.9% Romanian Orthodox.

Natives
 Constantin Cândea
 Alexandru Piru

References

Communes in Bacău County
Localities in Western Moldavia